Şirvani Camii, Şirvani Mehmet Efendi Camii or İki Şerefeli Camii is a mosque in Gaziantep, Turkey. 

It is located in the Seferpaşa neighborhood, southwest of Gaziantep Castle. The mosque, which is one of the oldest in the city, was undertaken by Şirvani Mehmet Effendi.

Another name for the mosque is the İki Şerefeli Camii (Double Balcony Mosque) because, unlike conventional mosques which have only one, its minaret has two balconies. Also distinctively, the minbar is located in a special slot and is moved out for special services.

On 6 February 2023, the mosque was seriously damaged by two consecutive earthquakes.

References

Mosques in Gaziantep
Buildings damaged by the 2023 Turkey–Syria earthquake